FGD may refer to:

 Familial glucocorticoid deficiency
 Fderik Airport, in Mauritania
 Flue-gas desulfurization
 Focus group discussion
 Functional generative description, a linguistic framework 
 FYVE, RhoGEF and PH domain containing